Vladimir Bobrezhov (sometimes listed as Vladimir Borbreshov, born 14 April 1968) is a Soviet sprint canoeist who competed in the late 1980s and early 1990s. He won five medals at the ICF Canoe Sprint World Championships with two golds (K-4 10000 m: 1989, 1990), two silvers (K-2 1000 m: 1989, 1990), and a bronze (K-4 10000 m: 1993).

Bobrezhov also competed for the Unified Team at the 1992 Summer Olympics in Barcelona in the K-4 1000 m event, but was eliminated in the semifinals.

References

Sports-reference.com profile

1968 births
Canoeists at the 1992 Summer Olympics
Living people
Olympic canoeists of the Unified Team
Soviet male canoeists
Russian male canoeists
ICF Canoe Sprint World Championships medalists in kayak